The 1939 Wayne Tartars football team represented Wayne University (later renamed Wayne State University) as an independent during the 1939 college football season. In their eighth year under head coach Joe Gembis, the Tartars compiled a 4–5 record and were outscored by opponents, 117 to 66.

Schedule

References

Wayne
Wayne State Warriors football seasons
Wayne Tartars football